The Abandonment of the Jews: America and the Holocaust 1941–1945 is a 1984 nonfiction book by David S. Wyman, former Josiah DuBois professor of history at the University of Massachusetts Amherst. Wyman was the chairman of the David S. Wyman Institute for Holocaust Studies. The Abandonment of the Jews has been well received by most historians, and has won numerous prizes and widespread recognition, including a National Jewish Book Award, the Anisfield-Wolf Award, the Present Tense Literary Award, the Stuart Bernath Prize from the Society for Historians of American Foreign Relations, and the Theodore Saloutos Award of the Immigration History Society, and was nominated for the National Book Critics Circle Award."

Argument
In response to Nazi determination and concerted action to remove Jews from Europe by any means necessary, the non-Axis world closed many possibilities for emigration to other countries. For example, legal immigration to safety in Palestine, an area that had been assigned by the League of Nations as a Jewish homeland for Jews who were not safe in their original countries, was severely limited by the Mandate authorities in 1939; and many nations simply refused to allow European Jews entry to their countries. As Nazi Germany gained power and inherited larger Jewish populations in conquered territories (such as Poland) the policies in most nations were either to eliminate the Jewish presence (in the case of Axis countries) or to discourage Jewish immigration (in the case of non-Axis countries.) The closing of the immigration possibilities in America is covered by Wyman in his 1968 book Paper Walls: America and the Refugee Crisis, 1938-1941. Wyman continues to document this aspect of World War II history in The Abandonment of the Jews, which covers the period of 1941–1945, when America and the Allies fought against Germany and the Final Solution Holocaust progressed to its most lethal stages.

Wyman summarizes his principal findings in the Preface (presented below in edited precis):

 The American State Department and the British Foreign Office had no intention of rescuing large number of European Jews. On the contrary, they continually feared that Germany or other Axis nations might release tens of thousands of Jews into Allied hands. Any such exodus would have placed intense pressure on Britain to open Palestine and the United States to take in more Jewish refugees... Consequently, their policies were aimed at obstructing rescue possibilities....
Authenticated information that the Nazis were systematically exterminating European Jewry was made public... in November 1942. President Roosevelt did nothing... for fourteen months, then moved only because... political pressures....
The War Refugee Board... received little power, almost no cooperation... and grossly inadequate funding. (Contributions from Jewish organizations.... covered 90 percent of the WRB's costs)... save approximately 200,000 Jews and at least 20,000 non-Jews.
... State Department... policies, only 21,000 refugees were allowed to enter... during... war with Germany... 10 percent of the number who could have been legally admitted....
.... factors hampered (rescue)... anti-Semitism and anti-immigration attitudes,... entrenched in Congress; the mass media's failure... near silence of the Christian churches and almost all of their leadership (with notable exceptions, such as the Archbishop of Canterbury, or New York's Archbishop Francis Spellman); indifference... President's failure....
 American Jewish leaders... failure to assign top priority to the rescue issue.
 In 1944 the United States... rejected several appeals to bomb the Auschwitz gas chambers and railroads... in the very months that... numerous massive American bombing raids were taking place with fifty miles of Auschwitz. Twice... bombers struck... not five miles from the gas chambers.
... much more could have been done to rescue the Jews, if a real effort had been made.... the reasons repeatedly invoked by government official for not being able to rescue Jews could be put aside when it came to other Europeans who needed help.
... Roosevelt's indifference... the worst failure of his presidency.
... the American rescue record was better than that of Great Britain, Russia, or the other Allied nations... because of the work of the War Refugee Board... American Jewish organizations... provide most of the WRB's funding, and the overseas rescue operations of several Jewish organizations.

The Abandonment of the Jews argues that American (and British) political leaders during the Holocaust, including President Roosevelt, turned down proposals that could have saved hundreds of thousands of European Jews from death in German concentration camps. Wyman documents, for example, how Roosevelt repeatedly refused asylum to Jewish refugees and failed to order the bombing of railway lines leading to Auschwitz. At the same time, most Jewish leaders in America and in Palestine did little to pressure these governments to change their policy. Some American newspapers, including the New York Times, are said to have underreported or buried reports off their front pages because of anti-Semitism. The Times was owned by Jews but may have wanted not to appear as Jewish advocates in their coverage.

Wyman examines the documents suggesting that the US and British governments turned down numerous proposals to accept European Jews. The issue was raised at a White House conference on March 27, 1943, of top American and British wartime leaders, including Roosevelt, US Secretary of State Cordell Hull, British Foreign Secretary Anthony Eden, presidential advisor Harry Hopkins, and the British Ambassador to Washington, Lord Halifax. Hull raised the question of having the Allies offer to accept 60,000 to 70,000 Jews from Bulgaria, a German ally. Eden reportedly objected, citing the risk that Hitler may take up similar offers for the Jews of Germany and Poland, and said that "there simply are not enough ships and means of transportation to handle them."

Wyman writes that because of a combination of nativism, anti-Semitism and an unwillingness to act on any proposal not of direct strategic value, thousands and possibly millions of Jews died who might otherwise have been saved. He documents numerous cases where the Allies found resources, such as shipping, to give aid and rescue to tens of thousands of non-Jewish refugees, while at the same time denying similar aid or rescue efforts to Jews. For instance, he documents how the British government turned back endangered Jews from Mandatory Palestine, while at the same time they generously accepted between 9,000 and 12,000 non-Jewish Greek and 1,800 non-Jewish Polish refugees into Palestine. He cites many cases where American and British authorities turned down offers by Nazis to exchange Jews for resources, often with documentation on how the Allies appeared to fear that there would be so many Jews that it could strain the Allies' war effort. He also documents the efforts of the US State Dept. to deny asylum to endangered Jews, and the failure of the American Jewish establishment to put sufficient pressure on US politicians, such as Roosevelt, to engage in effective rescue operations. Breckinridge Long, one of the four assistant secretaries of state, and a clique of other State Department executives, figure prominently in many episodes in this history. Wyman documents how Long and his colleagues repeatedly obstructed measures that would have effectively rescued Jews.

Wyman cites several organizations as comparatively effective in rescue efforts, particularly some Orthodox Jewish organizations, the American Jewish Joint Distribution Committee, and the Revisionist Zionist faction called the 'Bergsonites,' which took their name from their leader, the so-called "Peter H. Bergson," which was actually the English nom-de-guerre of Hillel Kook, a Palestinian Jew and nephew of Rav Abraham Isaac Kook who was associated with the radical armed underground group Irgun Zvai Leumi. "Bergson" came to the United States to form the 'American Friends of a Jewish Palestine,' the 'Committee for a Jewish Army,' and other efforts to rescue European Jewry.

Wyman is particularly critical of the mainstream American Jewish and Zionist leadership, which was ineffective in its rescue efforts and often prioritized the fight against American anti-Semitism and strengthening the Zionist position for a postwar Jewish commonwealth in Palestine (Israel) above the need to rescue Jews from Nazi persecution.

In the chapter on 'Responsibility', Wyman has a subsection, 'What Might Have Been Done', in which he acknowledges that the possibilities for rescue were "narrowed by the Nazis' determination to wipe out the Jews" and that "War conditions themselves made rescue difficult... most likely it would not have been possible to rescue millions." He contends, however, that "without impeding the war effort, additional tens of thousands--probably hundreds of thousands--could have been saved." He then presents a selection of twelve programs that were proposed (among others) during the Holocaust that could have been effective if only they had been tried. His selection included (in edited precis):

(1) Most important, the War Refugee Board should have been established in 1942. And it should have received adequate government funding and much broader powers.

(2) The U.S. government, working through neutral governments or the Vatican, could have pressured Germany to release the Jews....

(3) The United States could have applied constant pressure on Axis satellites to release their Jews....

(4)... Strong pressure needed to be applied to neutral countries near the Axis... to take Jews in....havens of refuge outside of Europe were essential.... Thus the routes would have remained open and a continuing flow of refugees could have left Axis territory.

(5) Locating enough outside havens... presented difficulties.... a camp existence... was still preferable to... death.... other countries used American stinginess as an rebuttal when questioned for not accepting Jews. For instance, in Jerusalem on his 1942 trip around the world, Wendell Willkie confronted the British authorities with the need to admit large numbers of Jews into Palestine. The British High Commissioner replied that since the United States was not taking Jews in even up to the quota limits, Americans were hardly in a position to make such criticisms.

(6) Shipping was needed to transport Jews from neutral countries to outside havens.... Early in 1943 the United States turned its back on a Romanian proposal to release 70,000 Jews. It was a pivotal failure....

(7) A campaign to stimulate and assist escape would have led to a sizable outflow of Jews....

(8) Much larger amounts of money should have been transferred to Europe... facilitating escapes,... hiding Jews.... supplying food... strengthening Jewish undergrounds, and... non-Jewish forces.

(9) Much more effort should have gone into finding ways to send in food and medical supplies....

(10)... the United States could have applied much more pressure... on neutral governments, the Vatican, and the International Red Cross to induce them to take earlier and more vigorous action....

(11) Some military assistance was possible....

(12) Much more publicity about the extermination of the Jews should have been disseminated throughout Europe....

Counterarguments

The overwhelming majority of professional historians who specialize in World War II and/or the Holocaust have generally endorsed, supported, or have been influenced by Wyman's arguments. The primary criticisms target Wyman's criticisms of Roosevelt, defend the actions of establishment Jewish organizations, and/or challenge his contention that the Allies could have effectively mitigated the slaughter of Jews by bombing the Auschwitz extermination facilities, a topic often referred to as the Auschwitz bombing debate.

Dr James H. Kitchens III, an archivist of the United States Air Force Historical Research Center, criticized Wyman for his neglect for the situation of total war in which the Allies were enveloped and for basing his book on sociopolitical sources, without quality references to military history, which he argues is crucial to the bombing debate. Kitchens argued that it would not have been practical to bomb Auschwitz. Kitchens' two principal points are 1) the Allies did not have sufficiently detailed intelligence about the location of these facilities to reasonably target them, and 2) the logistics of bombing would have been too difficult to reasonably expect a successful result. Historian Richard Levy supports Kitchens' position. Other historians have pointed out 1) there were opportunities for the Allies to acquire sufficient military intelligence on potential Auschwitz targets, though it appears that no concerted effort was made gather such information. and 2) there were many successful Allied bombing missions that were just as difficult and were supported by comparably incomplete intelligence. The notion that the Auschwitz mission would have been particularly difficult is strongly challenged; some have speculated that Kitchens may have been influenced by the desire to defend his employer.

There are very few historians who disagree with Wyman's position that more could have been done by the Allies and Neutrals to rescue endangered European Jews. One exception is William D. Rubinstein, whose The Myth of Rescue: Why the Democracies Could Not Have Saved More Jews from the Nazis is explicitly a critical response to "The Abandonment of the Jews" and a host of other works that support Wyman's positions. Rubinstein argues that the Western powers had a creditable record of accepting immigrants, Palestine was not a potential refuge, and effective allied action against the extermination camps was not possible.

Even Wyman's most strident critics, however, acknowledge that many of Wyman's contentions are valid. Rubinstein, for instance, appears to largely agree with Wyman (and many other historians) that the influence of Palestinian Arab political leadership, led by Grand Mufti of Jerusalem Haj Amin al-Husseini, and the 1936–1939 Arab revolt in Palestine were factors in causing the British government to abandon their temporary mandate over Palestine, which was primarily to establish a homeland for the Jewish people that would be available to facilitate rescue of endangered Jews in their time of need. Both Wyman and his critics agree that their decision to abandon the mandate was embodied in the White Paper of 1939, which reduced Jewish immigration to Palestine to a yearly quota of only 10,000, with a maximum of 75,000 immigrants, and after a five-year period relegated all Jewish immigration to the approval of the Palestinian Arab polity. The long-lasting consequences to the European Jewry during the Holocaust of the abandonment of the mandate is generally recognized by Wyman's critics, though Wyman details the detrimental effects in greater detail than many of his detractors.

For instance, the differences of opinion between Rubinstein and Wyman on the issue rest principally on Rubinstein's argument that the Zionist Jews in Palestine (such as David Ben-Gurion) are primarily to blame for not giving refuge to European Jews in Palestine, rather than putting the responsibility on the British authorities or the Palestinian Arabs who violently opposed such rescue efforts. Some  historians have taken Rubinstein and other Wyman critics to task for such assertions, and have directly attacked these criticisms of Wyman's positions as unscholarly "polemic."

Examples where Jews were rescued from the Axis countries

Many historians, including Dr. David Kranzler, who specialize in documenting those who rescued Jews note that large number of Jews were saved and argue that even more could have been saved, often using the same historical examples that are covered by Wyman. In most cases, the rescue efforts were not initiated by large established free world Jewish and Zionist organizations, which often obstructed rescue activism; the Allied governments; or by institution like the Vatican nor the Red Cross. Most successful rescue operations were the result of work by non-establishment small maverick Jewish groups and non-Jews, who largely acted outside and often against instructions of their own umbrella groups. Examples include:

 The Bratislava Working Group led by Gisi Fleischmann and Rabbi Chaim Michael Dov Weissmandl negotiated in early 1942 an about two year lull in transports from Slovakia for about $50,000 ransom to the SS via Dieter Wisliceny. In late 1942 they negotiated the so-called Europa Plan. Apparently, the Germans offered to stop transports from many areas for about two million dollars and demanded a 10% down payment. No one was willing to risk that sum, and the negotiations terminated. Yad Vashem states that it was only a German trick.
 Protection papers handed out from Switzerland by Orthodox Jewish rescuers George Mantello (Mandel - a Salvadorian diplomat from Transylvania) and Recha Sternbuch saved large numbers over the objections of a Swiss Jewish leader and US officials, particularly WRB's Roswell McClelland.
 Wilfrid Israel, originally from Berlin, was one of the key people who organized the Kindertransport to England, which saved large number of Jewish children.
 Recha Sternbuch smuggled into Switzerland large number of Jews at the Swiss-Austria border until someone in Switzerland who should have helped informed on her. She conducted from late 1944 to early 1945 negotiations with Heinrich Himmler via Swiss politician Jean-Marie Musy who was Himmler's acquaintance. That led to the release of many Jews from the Theresienstadt concentration camp and prevented murder of large number of Jews in some camps as the Allies were approaching, based on a ransom agreement with the Nazis. She was again informed on by the same person as noted earlier.
 Yitzchak Sternbuch, Recha Sternbuch's husband, raised and paid the ransom required to release the Jews in the Bergen-Belsen concentration camp who were on the so-called Kastner Train.
 Rabbi Solomon Schonfeld arranged refuge for thousands of Jews in Britain, including hundreds of children in the Kindertransport. He also convinced many English Church leaders and Parliamentarians to pass a motion allowing those Jews who could get out from Axis ruled territories to settle at least temporarily in parts of the British Empire. A group successfully lobbied against the motion since it excluded Palestine.
 In the US, persistent pressure on the Roosevelt administration by Hillel Kook and his Bergonsonite rescue group, despite considerable and prolonged obstruction by America's liberal Jewish leaders and mainstream Jewish organizations but with crucial support of many in Congress, the Senate, and Treasury Secretary Henry Morgenthau, Jr. and his team at the Treasury, led to establishment of the War Refugee Board. One if its actions was support of the Wallenberg mission to Budapest. David Wyman credits the War Refugee Board with the rescue of over 200,000 (including 120,000 in Hungary, in part because of the Wallenberg mission).
 Twenty four hours after receipt El Salvador embassy Jewish First Secretary George Mantello (Mandel) publicized what has now been called the Wetzler-Vrba Report included in the Auschwitz Protocol. Unfortunately, he received the report with much delay. Other Jews and Jewish/Zionist organizations that received it early did not make effective use of the information and some, like Rudolf Kastner tried to suppress the information. Mantello's action ignited significant large street protests in Switzerland, led to over 400 glaring headlines in Switzerland deploring Europe's barbarism and the sermons in many Swiss churches spoke about their "brothers and sisters": the Jews. Though the International Red Cross hesitated to intervene, others—including Pope Pius XII and King Gustav V of Sweden made personal appeals to Hungary's Regent Miklós Horthy. He received credible threats from Churchill and Roosevelt. Horthy then stopped the transports carrying about 12,000 Jews per day to Auschwitz. "By then, the Hungarian provinces had been cleared. Almost 440,000 Jews were gone, but most of Budapest's 230,000 Jews were still in the capital." Horthy then "offered to permit emigration of all Jewish children under ten who possessed visas to other countries, and all Jews of any age who possessed Palestine certificates." Although Sweden, Switzerland, and the US State Department eventually agreed to issue visas for 28,000 children, none of them was ever brought out of Hungary because of the month-long delay in Allied and neutral negotiations, and in the end, the Nazis took control of the situation. The delay in responding to Horthy's offer proved fatal to the deal he offered and to many Hungarian Jews. Three months after Horthy stopped the deportation trains, he was deposed and replaced by the Nazi puppet regime of Ferenc Szalasi and his fascist and anti-Semitic Arrow Cross, which unleashed a reign of terror against Hungary's remaining Jews, killed tens of thousand in the four months of their reign, and ended only when the Russians army conquered Hungary. 
 The lull in the Hungarian deportations and the offers made by Horthy enabled the Wallenberg mission and also rescue by many others in Budapest, such as Carl Lutz, Monsignor Angelo Rotta, Giorgio Perlasca, the Spanish legation, the Zionist Youth Underground in Budapest, and "put rescue in the air" empowering ordinary citizens to act on behalf of the remnant of Hungary's Jews. Raoul Wallenberg and Carl Lutz each rescued tens of thousands of Jews in Hungary and the Zionist Youth Underground rescued many thousands in not over 10,000 
 Many diplomats often broke diplomatic protocol, acted against the directives of their country, and rescued large number of Jews with visas and protection papers. Besides Carl Lutz and Raoul Wallenberg best known among them are Japanese Chiune Sugihara, Chinese Ho Feng-Shan, Portuguese Aristides de Sousa Mendes and Swedish Count Folke Bernadotte.
 A controversial proposal for rescue came from Adolf Eichmann, who offered Zionist rescuer Joel Brand in May, 1944, a deal to release 1,000,000 Jews in exchange for 10,000 trucks and commodities like coffee, tea, cocoa, and soap. Eichmann and other Nazis made similar offers to other Zionist rescuers (such as Saly Mayer, Sternbuch). Jean-Marie Musy, a former president of Switzerland and pro-Nazi enthusiast in the 1930s, took a prominent role in the negotiations. The Allies, however, rejected these 'ransom' arrangements even though Eichmann had made it very clear that the alternative entailed destroying the Jews. The Russians and Churchill agreed that ransoms should not be paid. The British held Brand as a prisoner to prevent such dealings and the pre-state Zionist leadership of Palestine did not seem overly interested. 
 Yad Vashem states in its museum that the controversial Rudolf Kastner's activities led to the rescue of over 22,000 Jews
 After controversial negotiations between Rudolf Kastner, Saly Mayer, and Adolf Eichmann, trains carrying some 1,700 Hungarian Jews were sent to Bergen-Belsen concentration camp, where they were kept relatively safely in return for money and gold and were freed at the end of 1944, when Yitzchak Sternbuch, in Switzerland, arranged for their rescue with a large ransom payment.
 There were many other successful rescue initiatives and also many more which some argue could have succeeded if Churchill and Roosevelt had received more public pressure. With ships packed with refugees, such as the St. Louis and refugee ships headed for Palestine were turned back, it is difficult to make a case for the thesis that rescue was not possible. Wyman's views are supported by numerous participants and scholars, such David Kranzler, Hillel Kook, Chaim Michael Dov Weissmandl, to name only a few.

See also
Bermuda conference
Évian Conference
Kindertransport
Auschwitz bombing debate
Jan Karski
Witold Pilecki
Report to the Secretary on the Acquiescence of This Government in the Murder of the Jews

References
Wyman, David S. 'The Abandonment Of The Jews: America and the Holocaust. New York: Pantheon Books, 1984, 444pp.
Wyman, David S., Medoff, Rafael. A Race Against Death: Peter Bergson, America, and the Holocaust. New Press, 2004.

also 
 
"Could The Allies Have Bombed Auschwitz", Jewish Virtual Library.
Abraham Fuch, The Unheeded Cry
Ben Hecht, Perfidy
David Kranzler, The Man Who Stopped the Trains to Auschwitz: George Mantello, El Salvador, and Switzerland's Finest Hour, Foreword by Senator Joseph I. Lieberman, Syracuse University Press (March 2001)
David Kranzler, Holocaust Hero: The Untold Story of Solomon Schonfeld, an Orthodox British Rabbi, Ktav Publishing House (December 2003)
David Kranzler, Thy Brothers' Blood: The Orthodox Jewish Response During the Holocaust, Artscroll (December 1987)
David Kranzler, Heroine of Rescue: The Incredible Story of Recha Sternbuch Who Saved Thousands from the Holocaust
Laurence Jarvik, Who Shall Live and Who Shall Die (video documentary, distributed by Kino International at: http://www.kino.com/video/item.php?film_id=349)
Rapaport, Louis. Shake Heaven & Earth: Peter Bergson and the Struggle to Rescue the Jews of Europe. Gefen Publishing House, Ltd., 1999.
VERAfilm, Among Blind Fools (documentary video)

Notes

History books about the Holocaust
International response to the Holocaust
The Holocaust and the United States
1984 non-fiction books